Rabian (also Romanized as Rabīān, Rabeyān, and Rabī‘ān) is a village in Kahshang Rural District, in the Central District of Birjand County, South Khorasan Province, Iran. At the 2006 census, its population was 44, in 17 families.

References 

Populated places in Birjand County